The Peace Support Training Centre (PSTC), is located at McNaughton Barracks, CFB Kingston, Ontario, Canada, and is a subordinate unit of the Canadian Army Doctrine and Training Centre. PSTC delivers training to the Canadian Armed Forces (CAF), other Canadian government departments (OGDs), and foreign militaries. PSTC is also engaged in instructor exchanges with ABCA, NATO, and other countries.

Role 
The Peace Support Training Centre (PSTC) was formed in July 1996 and was officially established as a unit 5 September 2000.  With an original mandate of training personnel for United Nations Military Observer (UNMO) positions, the PSTC has expanded to a unit of over 60 personnel that runs on average 35 courses per year with a throughput of 1,000 students.

PSTC is also developing training for personnel working as part of Provincial Reconstruction Teams (PRT), and Security Force Capacity Building/Security Force Advisor Training (SFCB/SFAT).

Mission 
"PSTC will provide specific, individual training to prepare selected members of the Canadian Forces, Other Government Departments (OGD) and foreign military personnel for Full-Spectrum Operations (FSO) within the contemporary operating environment, while fulfilling our Centre of Excellence (CoE) responsibilities."

Vision 
"As a lead Joint, Inter-Agency, Multinational training centre, PSTC’s vision is to be recognized by all Canadian Government Departments as the trainer of choice and experts in the delivery of individual readiness training and campaign-winning enablers."

Courses and Training Packages 
Civil-Military Cooperation (CIMIC) Operator
Civil-Military Cooperation (CIMIC) Staff Officer
Hazardous Environment Training (HET)
Individual Pre-Deployment Training (IPT)
Information Operations (Info Ops) Officer
United Nations Military Expert on Mission Training (UNMO Military Observer) (UNMEM)
Psychological Operations (PSYOPS) Tactical Operator
Psychological Operations (PSYOPS) Analyst
Psychological Operations (PSYOPS) Officer

Organization 
PSTC is a training unit directly under the Canadian Army Doctrine and Training Centre. It has a liaison and coordination relationship with the Influence Activities Task Force (IATF), another organization under CADTC. PSTC has two training sub-units and a standards sub-unit. The training sub-units and their specialties are as follows:

A Squadron – Military Observer, Hazardous Environment Training, Individual Pre-Deployment Training, Security Force Advisory Training.
B Squadron - Civil-Military Cooperation, Information Operations, Psychological Operations

2012/13 - 18 
PSTC has trained all personnel in Security Force Advisor Training (SFAT) for the Canadian part of the NATO Training Mission - Afghanistan (NTM-A) as well as run numerous influence activities courses to prepare members for the managed readiness plan.  This year also saw the successful completion of three mobile training team (MTT) deployments to Tanzania, Guatemala and Senegal to teach PSO and CIMIC.

PTSC continues to support peacekeeping efforts at the present time.

External links 
Peace Support Training Centre
Pearson Peacekeeping Centre
United Nations Peacekeeping

References 

Canadian Armed Forces
Military units and formations of the Canadian Army
Military education and training in Canada
Military training facilities
Canadian Armed Forces education and training establishments